Lattuada is an Italian surname. Notable people with the surname include:

Alberto Lattuada (1914–2005), Italian film director
Felice Lattuada (1882–1962), Italian composer
Giovanni Lattuada (1905–1984), Italian artistic gymnast

Italian-language surnames